Indian Creek is a stream in Cape Girardeau County in the U.S. state of Missouri. It is a tributary of the Mississippi River.

The stream headwaters arise at  approximately one-half mile south of Pocahontas just east of Missouri Route C at an elevation of approximately 590 feet. The stream forms the northern boundary of the Trail of Tears State Park just prior to its confluence.

Indian Creek took its name from the Shawnee Indians in the area.

See also
List of rivers of Missouri

References

Rivers of Cape Girardeau County, Missouri
Rivers of Missouri